Lotfi Ayed (born 25 February 1959) is a Swedish boxer. He competed at the 1984 Summer Olympics and the 1988 Summer Olympics. At the 1984 Summer Olympics, he lost to Frank Tate of the United States.

References

1959 births
Living people
Swedish male boxers
Olympic boxers of Sweden
Boxers at the 1984 Summer Olympics
Boxers at the 1988 Summer Olympics
People from Sousse
Tunisian emigrants to Sweden
AIBA World Boxing Championships medalists
Light-middleweight boxers
20th-century Swedish people